Karen McDonald may refer to:

 Karen McDonald (Coronation Street), fictional character
 Karen McDonald (politician) (born 1970), American lawyer and politician in Michigan